Oervigia is an extinct genus of lungfish in the family Rhinodipteridae from the Devonian of Greenland.

See also

 Sarcopterygii
 List of sarcopterygians
 List of prehistoric bony fish

References

Prehistoric lobe-finned fish genera